Rurala Road is a town in the tehsil of Jaranwala, district of Faisalabad, Punjab, Pakistan.it is 25KM from Jarnawala city. Famous Punjabi Poet Munawar Shakeel from 280 GB 2 KM from Rurala road.

Location
Rurala Road is also known as Chak No.283 GB and is located between Tehsil Jaranwala and Tehsil Tandlianwala.

Government 
Its Union Council number is 65. The chairman of the Union Council is Abdul Ghafoor Jappa and the Vice Chairman is Abdul Rehman, who is also the advocate of the High Court and founder of a cable TV service.

Infrastructure 
It has a railway station, a bank (HBL), a post office, a bus stand, a taxi stand and markets, as well as the offices of the Union Council, a government hospital and a veterinary hospital. Four private hospitals are there.

A large two-story mosque is nearby, Tahsil Jaranwala. It doubles as a trading post for nearby villages. Rurala Road was one of the busiest villages with the biggest bazaar in the area around Faisalabad in the late 1970s to '80s but due to migration into cities including Faisalabad and Lahore, its importance has diminished..

Four food storage godowns operate in Rurala Road, run by the Government of Punjab.

Education
The schools in this town include:

 Government Boys High School 282 GB
 Government Girls High School
 Government Boys Primary School
 Mughal Public School
 Quality Educational Complex
 Allama Iqbal Public School
 Jinnah Public School
 Usama Public School
 AL Sooran Public High School
 Al Daanish School of punjab

Transport

Bus
Rurala Road has bus connections to Faisalabad and Jaranwala.

Train
Rurala Road railway station is connected with Lahore (via Jaranwala, Sheikhupura) and with Shorkot (via Tandlianwala, Kamalia) by rail.

Sports

Football
Usama Football Club is known at the national level. The town's other football clubs are Gafari Memorial Football Club, Young Generation Stars Football Club, Heroes Football Club, Hamid Zafar Memorial Football Club.

Each year, the Hamid Zafar and Ghafari Memorial Football Tournament is held in the town to commemorate a local footballer.

Cricket
Each year, the Sharafat Amjad Waqar Memorial Cricket Tournament is held in the town to commemorate a local cricketer. Various cricket teams from Jaranwala tehsil participate in this tournament, which is well known in the area.

The town's cricket clubs are Ahtisham, Ravi, Young Generation Stars, Young Generation Heroes, Rising Stars Eleven, KS Cricket Eleven Young Star

References

External links
 Rurala Road on Tageo.com
Rurala Road on MapLandia.com
Rurala Road on Forumjar.com
 http://www.dawn.com/news/1194607

Cities and towns in Faisalabad District